The Pietenpol Workshop and Garage is a small building in Cherry Grove, Minnesota, United States, where aviation pioneer Bernard Pietenpol designed and built aircraft. The wood-framed structure was added to the National Register of Historic Places in 1981.  The original hangar from Pietenpol Field was moved to Pioneer Airport in Oshkosh, Wisconsin.

References

Air transportation buildings and structures on the National Register of Historic Places
Buildings and structures in Fillmore County, Minnesota
Industrial buildings and structures on the National Register of Historic Places in Minnesota
National Register of Historic Places in Fillmore County, Minnesota